Lee Jeong-gyu (born 1937) is a South Korean wrestler. He competed in the men's freestyle flyweight at the 1956 Summer Olympics.

References

External links
 

1937 births
Living people
South Korean male sport wrestlers
Olympic wrestlers of South Korea
Wrestlers at the 1956 Summer Olympics
Place of birth missing (living people)